Dioon califanoi is a species of cycad that is native to Oaxaca and Puebla states, Mexico. It is found near Teotitlán del Camino and Huautla de Jiménez.

References

External links
 
 

califanoi
Plants described in 1979
Endemic flora of Mexico
Flora of the Sierra Madre de Oaxaca
Flora of Oaxaca
Flora of Puebla